Le nom du vent (French for "The name of the wind") is a 2003 album by jazz band Maak's Spirit.  It was recorded at De Meent (Alsemberg, Belgium) in February 2002 after a meeting with Gnawa musicians in North Africa.  They recorded in circle, facing each other's to achieve a better communication.

Track listing
"Par Example" – 6:23
"Aioria" – 4:13
"Wat is de kwax?"  – 2:10
"Le nom du vent" – 6:20
"Continue" – 4:58
"Shergui" – 6:12
"Soumaya's dreams" – 3:48
"A short break in Telouet" – 2:28
"La complainte des cailloux" – 1:47
"The oneagain song" – 8:23
"The elephant is dead" – 2:19
"De kwax is pass" – 1:02
"Happiness" – 11:17

Personnel
 Laurent Blondiau - trumpet, leader
 Jeroen Van Herzeele - tenor saxophone
 Michel Massot - tubas, trombone
 Jean-Yves Evrard - guitar
 Otti Van Der Werf - acoustic bass
 Eric Thielemans - drums
 Hugues Deschaux - mixing
 Jarek Frankowski - mastering
 Vincent De Bast - mastering
 Corbi - graphic design
 Erik Lambert - photography
 Sébastien Koeppel - photography
 Jos Knaepen - photography

External links
 Jazz in Belgium website

Mâäk's Spirit albums
2003 albums